Bassalia Ouattara (born 24 February 1992) is an Ivorian footballer who plays for Anadia, as a midfielder.

Career
He made his professional debut in the Segunda Liga for União da Madeira on 9 September 2012 in a game against Santa Clara.

References

External links

1992 births
Living people
People from Bondoukou
Ivorian footballers
Ivorian expatriate footballers
Expatriate footballers in Portugal
Ivorian expatriate sportspeople in Portugal
Gondomar S.C. players
C.F. União players
Liga Portugal 2 players
Académico de Viseu F.C. players
Atlético Clube de Portugal players
C.D. Feirense players
Lusitano FCV players
S.C.U. Torreense players
S.U. Sintrense players
Anadia F.C. players
A.D. Nogueirense players
Sertanense F.C. players
C.D.C. Montalegre players
Association football midfielders